Long Reach High School is a public high school located in Columbia, Maryland, United States. It is part of the Howard County Public School System.

History
In 1995, Long Reach High School was built in Columbia, Maryland. The school was one of three new county schools opened in 1996 after a 16-year gap.

Notable alumni
Ron'Dell Carter, NFL player
Brent Faiyaz, R&B singer
Ian Jones-Quartey, animator
Darryl Webb, basketball player
Real

See also
 Howard County Public School System

References

External links

 School website

Public schools in Howard County, Maryland
Public high schools in Maryland
Educational institutions established in 1996
1996 establishments in Maryland